Ole Johannesen Staff (1799–1861) was a Norwegian politician.

He was elected to the Norwegian Parliament in 1836, 1839 and 1842, representing the rural constituency of Christians Amt (today named Oppland). He worked as a farmer.

References

 Tombstone at the cemetery of Lom

1789 births
1861 deaths
Members of the Storting
Oppland politicians